Creed is an English surname. At the time of the British Census of 1881, its frequency was highest in Somerset (7.4 times the British average), followed by Gloucestershire, Dorset, Kent, Oxfordshire, Norfolk, Warwickshire, London, Buckinghamshire and Wiltshire.

Notable people with the surname include:

 Barbara Creed, cultural critic
 Brutus Creed, ring name of professional wrestler Jacob Kasper
 Consequences Creed (born 1986), early ring persona of American professional wrestler Austin Watson, now better known as Xavier Woods
 Frederick G. Creed (1871–1957), Canadian inventor
 Helios Creed, American musician, guitarist of Chrome
 James Creed, MP for Canterbury
 John Creed (politician) (1842–1930), Australian politician
 John Creed (soldier) (1819–1872), Irish-American soldier
 Julius Creed, ring name of professional wrestler Drew Kasper
 Linda Creed (1949–1986), American songwriter
 Martin Creed (born 1968), English artist
 Michael Creed (born 1963), Irish politician
 Percy Redfern Creed, Irish author
 Sheldon Creed (born 1997), racing driver

Fictional characters
 Adonis Creed, a boxer in the Rocky spin-off and sequel Creed
 Apollo Creed, a boxer in the Rocky films
 Graydon Creed, a Marvel Comics villain
 Louis Creed, the protagonist of the Stephen King novel Pet Sematary
 Victor Creed, a.k.a. Sabretooth, a Marvel Comics character

See also
Charlie Creed-Miles (born 1972), British actor

References